Ceratarcha clathralis is a moth in the family Crambidae first described by Charles Swinhoe in 1894. It is found in the Indian state of Meghalaya.

References

Spilomelinae
Moths described in 1894
Moths of Japan